In Place Apart is the debut studio album by the American hardcore band Killing the Dream. The album was released on September 13, 2005 through Deathwish Inc. In Place Apart was produced by Kurt Ballou and features artwork designed by Jacob Bannon—both of which also play in the hardcore band Converge.

In 2013, seven years after the album's release, Deathwish posted an unreleased track from In Place Apart online titled "Ambition Deficit." The song was originally intended to be an intro song, but was ultimately scrapped.

Track listing 
 "Rough Draft (An Explanation)" – 1:49
 "Critical Thought" – 1:25
 "Post Script" – 1:49
 "If It Rains" – 1:41
 "Where the Heart Is" – 2:23
 "We're All Dead Ends" – 3:22
 "Ante Up" – 1:36
 "Past the Stars" – 1:47
 "Sick of Sleeping" – 2:31
 "Writer's Block" – 1:05
 "39th and Glisan" – 2:25
 "Four Years Too Late" – 3:38

Personnel 
Killing the Dream
 Christopher Chase – bass guitar
 Isaac Fratini – drums
 Elijah Horner – vocals
 Bart Mullis – guitars

Production and artwork
 Kurt Ballou – engineer, mixing
 Jacob Bannon – design, illustrations
 Zack Ohren – vocal engineer
 Alex Garcia Rivera – drum technician

References 

Killing the Dream albums
2005 albums
Deathwish Inc. albums
Albums with cover art by Jacob Bannon
Albums produced by Kurt Ballou